The Maronite Church of the Annunciation is a Maronite Catholic church that is located in the city of Nazareth, in northern Israel. It is dedicated to the Annunciation and should not be confused with the Roman Catholic Basilica of the Annunciation nor the Coptic Church of the Annunciation in the same city with the same name.

Background 
The Maronite Catholic community in Nazareth has existed since the year 1620. Today in Nazareth, there are about 1,200 Maronites.

Church building 
The Church of the Annunciation was built in the 21st century according to the latest architectural styles. The temple was built with reinforced concrete. The main dome is topped with an onion-shaped dome. To the side of the dome is a bell tower, on top of which stands a statue of the Virgin Mary. The interior is decorated with numerous sculptures and paintings by Italian painters Tese and Lamagna.

See also
Basilica of the Annunciation
Coptic Church of the Annunciation

References

Churches in Nazareth
Churches completed in 1774
Maronite churches in Israel